GMA Supershow, formerly titled as Germside and Germspesyal, is a Philippine television variety show broadcast by GMA Network. The show was the longest-running Sunday noontime variety show in Philippine television until 2015. Hosted by German Moreno, it premiered on May 7, 1978. The show concluded on January 26, 1997 with a total of 978 episodes. It was replaced by SOP in its timeslot.

Cast

 German Moreno 
 Sharon Cuneta 
 Jackie Lou Blanco 
 Bing Loyzaga 
 Lani Mercado 
 Zsa Zsa Padilla 
 Gretchen Barretto 
 Dawn Zulueta 
 Princess Punzalan 
 Maricel Laxa 
 Mariz 
 Jean Garcia 
 Sharmaine Arnaiz
 Rachel Alejandro
 Manilyn Reynes 
 Princess Revilla
 Rachel Anne Wolfe 
 Jam Morales 
 Raymond Lauchengco 
 Richard Reynoso 
 Ilac Diaz
 Chad Borja
 John Nite
 The Rainmakers
 Sunshine Cruz
 Sheryl Cruz
 Ike Lozada
 Karina Ramos
 Cristina Gonzales
 Kris Aquino
 Ana Gonzales
 Mutya Crisostomo
 Alicia Mayer 
 Caloy Garcia
 Arlene Muhlach
 Ogie Alcasid
 Francis Magalona
 Janno Gibbs
 Keempee de Leon 
 RS Francisco
 Chikiting Patrol Kids
 APO Hiking Society 
 Ruffa Gutierrez
 Edna Diaz
 Boots Anson-Roa
 Toni Rose Gayda
 Charo Santos-Concio
 Loren Legarda
 Cherie Gil
 Lorna Tolentino
 Nora Aunor
 Vilma Santos
 Aurora Salve
 Lilibeth Ranillo
 Maritess Gutierrez
 Sandy Andolong
 Alma Moreno
 Ana Gonzales
 Chiqui Hollman
 Dina Bonnevie
 Pilita Corrales
 Snooky Serna
 Pops Fernandez
 Maricel Soriano
 Aiko Melendez
 Donna Cruz
 Vina Morales
 Carmina Villarroel
 Charlene Gonzalez
 Mikee Cojuangco
 Julie Vega
 Janice de Belen
 Jaclyn Jose
 Christine Jacob
 Karla Estrada
 Amy Perez
 Regine Velasquez

Dancers
 VIP Dancers
 Kids at Work
 Abstract Dancers
 Bellestar Dancers
 Universal Motion Dancers
 The Streetboys
 Vicor Dancers
 OctoArts Dancers

Accolades

References

External links
 

1978 Philippine television series debuts
1997 Philippine television series endings
Filipino-language television shows
GMA Network original programming
Philippine variety television shows